Kirchdorf an der Iller is a town in the district of Biberach in Baden-Württemberg in Germany.

Geography 
It is located in upper Swabia at the river Iller which forms the border to Bavaria.

Economy 
Kirchdorf is the cradle of the Liebherr Group.

Notable citizens 
 Hans Liebherr (1915–1993), founder of Liebherr Group

References

External links

External links

Biberach (district)
Württemberg